Auxilio (possibly from Quechua Awkillu word for apu (Andean mountain deity) or grandfather, old man, the Hispanicized spelling is the misleading word Auxilio which means "assistance" or "support") is a mountain in the west of the Huayhuash mountain range in the Andes of Peru, about  high. It is located in the Ancash Region, Bolognesi Province, Pacllon District, and in the Lima Region, Cajatambo Province, Copa District. Auxilio lies on the sub-range west of Yerupaja, south of Auxilio Lake and southwest of the mountain Huacrish.

References

Mountains of Peru
Mountains of Ancash Region
Mountains of Lima Region